Sa'id al-Din Farghani (1231 – 1300) was a Persian Sufi mystic and scholar, who is known to have composed three works. 

Farghani was born in 1231 in Kashan, a town located in the Farghana Valley. Although the valley was nominally part of the Mongol Chagatai Khanate, it was governed by a representative of the Mongol Empire from 1227 to 1238.

Farghani became acquainted with Sufism through Najib al-Din Buzghush (died 1279), a member of the Suhrawardiyya and a student of Shibab al-Din Suhrawardi (died 1191). Farghani later moved to the city of Konya in Anatolia, where he studied under Sadr al-Din al-Qunawi (died 1274), the most prominent disciple of the Andalusian scholar and mystic Ibn Arabi (died 1240). During this period, Konya reportedly served as a gathering place for students who wanted to increase their knowledge in Sufism. Through Qunawi, Farghani became acquainted with Ibn Arabi's ʿulum al-haqiqa ("Mystical theosophy").

In 1247, Qunawi took his students (including Farghani) to Egypt, where he taught them the poem Nazm al-suluk ("Poem of the Sufi way"), also known as al-Taʾiyya al-kubra ("The greater ode with rhyming verse based upon the letter taʾ"), by the Egyptian Sufi poet Ibn al-Farid (died 1234).

Farghani died in August 1300 in the city of Damascus.

References

Sources 
 
 
 
 
 

1231 births
1300 deaths
13th-century Iranian people
14th-century Iranian people
Ilkhanate-period poets
People from the Sultanate of Rum